Eugenodilol is an alpha-1 blocker and beta blocker with weak β2-adrenergic receptor agonist activity derived from eugenol.

References

Allyl compounds
Alpha-1 blockers
Beta blockers
Beta-adrenergic agonists